is a former Japanese football player.

Playing career
Isono was born in Gunma Prefecture on January 8, 1974. After graduating from high school, he joined the Yokohama Marinos in 1992. However he did not play in any matches while there. In 1995, he moved to the Regional Leagues club Prima Ham Tsuchiura (later Mito HollyHock). The club was promoted to the Japan Football League in 1997 and he played as a regular player. In 1999, the club joined the new Japan Football League and was promoted to the J2 League in 2000. He retired at the end of the 2000 season.

Club statistics

References

External links

1974 births
Living people
Association football people from Gunma Prefecture
Japanese footballers
J1 League players
J2 League players
Japan Football League (1992–1998) players
Japan Football League players
Yokohama F. Marinos players
Mito HollyHock players
Association football midfielders